The 2018–19 Air Force Falcons men's basketball team represented the United States Air Force Academy during the 2018–19 NCAA Division I men's basketball season. The Falcons, led by seventh-year head coach Dave Pilipovich, played their home games at the Clune Arena on the Air Force Academy's main campus in Colorado Springs, Colorado as members of the Mountain West Conference. They finished the season 14–18, 8–10 in Mountain West play to finish in sixth place. They defeated San Jose State in the first round of the Mountain West tournament before losing in the quarterfinals to Fresno State.

Previous season 
The Falcons finished the season 12–19, 6–12 in Mountain West play to finish in ninth place. They lost in the first round of the Mountain West tournament to UNLV.

Offseason

Departures

2018 recruiting class
There were no recruiting class for Air Force for 2018.

Roster

Schedule and results 

|-
!colspan=9 style=| Exhibition

|-
!colspan=9 style=| Non-conference regular season

|-
!colspan=9 style=| Mountain West regular season

|-
!colspan=9 style=| Mountain West tournament

References 

Air Force
Air Force Falcons men's basketball seasons
Air Force Falcons
Air Force Falcons